Charlie Grace may refer to:

 Charlie Grace (EastEnders), a character on British soap opera EastEnders
 Charlie Grace (TV series), a 1995 American crime drama